Peoplestown is a neighborhood of Atlanta just south of Center Parc Stadium and Downtown Atlanta. 
 Ormond Street and the Summerhill neighborhood on the north,
 Hill Street and the Grant Park neighborhood on the east,
 the BeltLine and the Chosewood Park neighborhood on the south, and
 the Downtown Connector (I-75/I-85) and railroad tracks on the west, across which is the Pittsburgh neighborhood. It is part of NPU V.

History

In 1885, the Atlanta Electric Railway built a line along Capitol Avenue, and construction of housing began in what is now Peoplestown. The neighborhood is named for the Peoples family, who owned land there. The neighborhood developed white, integrated, and black sections. The white sections were mostly on the west of Peoplestown, and the all-black sections mostly on the east side. In addition, many black residents lived in detached units at the back of white lots.

One of Atlanta's most fashionable residential streets in the 1890s was Washington Street, running from the state capitol through the Washington-Rawson district to what is now Peoplestown. Newspaper ads in the 1890s promoted "Washington Heights" along Washington south of Ormond, now part of Peoplestown.

In the 1930s, the black areas started to receive utilities. In the 1920s and 1930s, the area became less attractive to affluent whites who could afford automobiles, which allowed them to live in the more desirable northside neighborhoods and still commute to their downtown jobs, though the 1960 census still showed a neighborhood that was about half white and half black.

The construction of the Downtown Connector in the 1960s required the teardown of some houses on the western side of Peoplestown. Additional houses were torn down in the mid-1980s when the Connector was widened, as a result of the defeat of I-485 by intown neighborhoods such as Virginia-Highland and Inman Park.

In the 1990s, revitalization efforts coalesced into the Peoplestown Revitalization Corporation which has set up a neighborhood watch program and other safety programs. A redevelopment plan for Peoplestown was drawn up in 1996.

Architecture
In addition to new development, Peoplestown contains examples of  Queen Anne,  Folk Victorian, and Craftsman architecture.

Parks
 D. H. Stanton Park. This park has been renovated as part of the development of the BeltLine, on which it is located.
 Four Corners Park

References

External links
 "NPU V", the Atlanta Civic Site, The Annie E. Casey Foundation

Neighborhoods in Atlanta
Streetcar suburbs